De Dubiis Nominibus ("On Doubtful Nouns") is a 7th-century document, possibly from Bordeaux, by an anonymous author. It is an alphabetically sorted list of words whose gender, plural form or spelling was in question by the author. The author attempted to resolve the questions through citations from classical and Christian authors with notes next to each word.

References
Fr. Glorie., ed., Tatvini Opera omnia. Variae collectiones aenigmatum Merovingicae aetatis. Anonymus. De dubiis nominibus. Series: Corpus Christianorum Series Latina, vols. 133-133a. Turnholt: Typographi Brepols, 1968. (BR60 .C49, vols. 133-133A)
Michael Herren (1989). "Dubiis Nominibus, De". Dictionary of the Middle Ages. Vol-4. 

7th-century Latin books